West Woombye is a rural residential locality in the Sunshine Coast Region, Queensland, Australia. In the  West Woombye had a population of 1,007 people.

Geography
West Woombye is in the Sunshine Coast hinterland. As the name suggests, it is west of the town and locality of Woombye. The surrounding suburbs include Towen Mountain, Hunchy, Dulong, Palmwoods and Coes Creek. There is farming within the area with crops such as lychees, macadamias, mangoes and avocados grown.

The main road running through West Woombye is Blackall Range Road.  This road turns into Dulong Road once in the suburb of Dulong.  As the area incorporates the Blackall Range leading up to Montville, the area is noted for its scenery.  However, there are a number of notable creeks within area prone to flooding in heavy rain, primarily Petrie Creek. This mostly affects the roads off Blackall Range Road, such as Ruwoldt Road, Carruthers Road, and the Jackson Road area.

History 
The name Woombye comes from the Kabi word wambai meaning black myrtle tree, which was used for handles for axes.

In the  West Woombye had a population of 1,007 people.

Education 
There are no schools in West Woombye. The nearest government primary schools are Woombye State School in neighbouring Woombye to the east, Burnside State School in Burnside to the north, Mapleton State School in Mapleton to the north-west, and Montville State School in Montville to the south-west. The nearest government secondary schools are Burnside State High School in Burnside to the north and Nambour State College in Nambour to the north-east.

Amenities
There are a number of parks in the locality, including:

 Floydia Bushland Reserve
 Ted Duffield Memorial Park
 Triunia Bushland Reserve
 Triunia Conservation Area

Transport
There is no notable public transport in the area except the school bus runs and taxi.  Depending on the starting point within West Woombye it takes about 5 to 7 minutes by vehicle into the Woombye township, 10 to 12 minutes to Nambour township and 5 to 7 minutes to Mapleton.

References

Suburbs of the Sunshine Coast Region
Localities in Queensland